Marco Kotze (born 25 August 1986 in Germiston, South Africa) is a South African rugby union player, currently playing with French Fédérale 1 side Marmande. He originally played as a winger, but has been subsequently converted to a loose-forward or a lock.

Career

Youth

Kotze went to Laerskool Randhart in Alberton, in a team that won the Super Twelve national competition for primary schools, playing alongside future  Super Rugby player Derick Minnie. Kotze earned a call-up to the ' Under-13 Craven Week squad.

He went to Hoërskool Marais Viljoen in Alberton, where he appeared mainly as a winger and also earned a selection to the ' Craven Week team in 2004.

He progressed through the different age groups at the Golden Lions, playing at Under-19 level in 2005 and at Under-21 level in 2006. He also played for university side  during this time, representing them at the National Club Championships in 2006.

Golden Lions

He started his first match a week later, with the Golden Lions losing 29–35 to near rivals  in Witbank.

Sharks

He played for the  side during the 2007 season, but was never involved at first team level. During this time, he also played club rugby for Crusaders.

Falcons

By now, he was fully transformed into a loose forward and he made six appearances for the Falcons during the 2010 Vodacom Cup. He also scored his first try in first class rugby during this competition, scoring two tries in the Falcons' 33–65 defeat to Namibian side .

In 2011, he was named as a member of the ' leadership group for the 2011 Vodacom Cup season, making six appearances in the competition.

He scored one try in six starts during the 2012 Vodacom Cup competition and one try in seven starts in the 2012 Currie Cup First Division competition.

Move to Australia

In 2013,  head coach Jake White convinced Kotze to move to Australia to further his rugby career, but he had limited opportunities due to a shoulder injury. At the end of 2013, he moved north to Queensland, where he joined club side GPS Rugby in Brisbane.

Brisbane City / Reds

His performances for GPS earned him an inclusion in the  squad that played in the inaugural 2014 National Rugby Championship. He played in seven of Brisbane City's eight regular season matches to help his side qualify for the semi-finals by the competition after finishing in third position on the log.

Shortly after the end of the season, Kotze was included in Super Rugby franchise the ' Elite Development Squad for the 2015 Super Rugby season.

References

South African rugby union players
Living people
1986 births
Rugby union players from Germiston
Rugby union locks
Rugby union flankers
Rugby union number eights
Rugby union wings
Brisbane City (rugby union) players
Falcons (rugby union) players
Golden Lions players
Queensland Reds players
Tasman rugby union players
South African expatriate rugby union players
South African expatriate sportspeople in Australia
Expatriate rugby union players in Australia
South African expatriate sportspeople in New Zealand
Expatriate rugby union players in New Zealand